The Pavilion Indian Band or Ts'kw'aylaxw First Nation or Tsk'waylacw First Nation or Tsk'weylecw First Nation, and also known in the plural e.g. Ts'kw'alaxw First Nations,  is a First Nations government, located in the Fraser Canyon region of the Central Interior of the Canadian province of British Columbia. It was created when the government of the then-Colony of British Columbia established an Indian reserve system in the 1860s.

The Pavilion people are part of both the Secwepemc (Shuswap) and St'at'imc (Lillooet) Nations, and are located at Pavilion in the Fraser Canyon north of Lillooet.

The Pavilion Band is one of three Secwepemc bands that is not a member of either the Shuswap Nation Tribal Council or the Northern Shuswap Tribal Council.  The Pavilion people are also partly Sťáťimc (Lillooet) and belong to the Lillooet Tribal Council (St'at'imc Nation).

In the St'at'imcets language, Pavilion is called  Ts'kw'aylacw or Ts'kw'aylaxw ("frost") (Pavilion is at a high elevation and much of the community is in shade for most of the day in winter, leading to frozen ground).  The same name in the Secwepmectsin is Tsk'wéylecw.  The people themselves are called the Tsk'waylacw'mc in St'at'imcets, or Tsk'weylecw'mc in Secwepmectsin.

Reserves
Indian Reserves assigned to and administered by the Pavilion Band are:
Leon Creek Indian Reserve No. 2, 472.50 ha., at the junction of Leon Creek with the Fraser River
Leon Creek Indian Reserve No 2A, 176.40 ha., adjoining Leon Creek IR No. 2 to the south and west.
Marble Canyon Indian Reserve No. 3, 263.10 ha., on the Lillooet-Cache Creek highway (99) at the southeast end of Marble Canyon
Pavilion Indian Reserve No. 1. 881.20 ha., at (and forming a large part of) the community of Pavilion
Pavilion Indian Reserve No. 1A, 16.20 ha., one mile up McKay Creek on the opposite (west side) of the Fraser River from Pavilion
Pavilion Indian Reserve No. 3, 245.20 ha., north of and adjoining Marble Canyon IR No. 3
Pavilion Indian Reserve No. 4, 45.30 ha., adjoining Marble Canyon IR No. 3
Ts'kw'alaxw Indian Reserve No. 5, 16.10 ha.. 20 km southeast of Lillooet.

Population
There are 528 registered band members, 258 of whom live off-reserve.

References

External links
Shuswap Nation website
Indian and Northern Affairs Canada - First Nation Detail
Ts'kw'aylaxw First Nations homepage

St'at'imc governments
Secwepemc governments
First Nations governments in the Fraser Canyon
Lillooet Country